Double Curtain Glacier is a small glacier on the south slope of the Kukri Hills, just southwest of Mount Barnes, flowing toward the mouth of Ferrar Glacier in Victoria Land. It was mapped by the British Antarctic Expedition under Robert Falcon Scott, 1910–13, and so named by them because of its shape.

References 

Glaciers of Victoria Land
Scott Coast